Olu Agunloye is a Nigerian politician who is former Minister of Power and Steel and former Minister of State for Defence (Navy). In 2016 he joined the Social Democratic Party and became a candidate for Governor of Ondo State.

Agunloye has previously been a member of the People's Democratic Party and the Action Congress of Nigeria.

References

Action Congress of Nigeria politicians
Federal ministers of Nigeria
Living people
People from Ondo State
Peoples Democratic Party (Nigeria) politicians
Year of birth missing (living people)